Erasmus of Formia, also known as Saint Elmo (died c. 303), was a Christian saint and martyr. He is venerated as the patron saint of sailors and abdominal pain. Erasmus or Elmo is also one of the Fourteen Holy Helpers, saintly figures of Christian tradition who are venerated especially as intercessors.

Documentation of his life
The Acts of Saint Elmo were partly compiled from legends that confuse him with a Syrian bishop Erasmus of Antioch. Jacobus de Voragine in the Golden Legend credited him as a bishop at Formia over all the Italian Campania, as a hermit on Mount Lebanon, and a martyr in the Diocletianic Persecution. There appears to be no historical basis for his passio.

Account of life and martyrdom
Erasmus was Bishop of Formia, Italy. During the persecution against Christians under the emperors Diocletian (284-305) and Maximian Hercules (286-305), he left his diocese and went to Mount Libanus, where he hid for seven years. However, an angel is said to have appeared to him, and counseled him to return to his city.

On the way, he encountered some soldiers who questioned him. Erasmus admitted that he was a Christian and they brought him to trial at Antioch before the emperor Diocletian. After suffering terrible tortures, he was bound with chains and thrown into prison, but an angel appeared and helped him escape.

He passed through Lycia, where he raised up the son of an illustrious citizen. This resulted in a number of baptisms, which drew the attention of the Western Roman Emperor Maximian who, according to Voragine, was "much worse than was Diocletian." Maximian ordered his arrest and Erasmus continued to confess his faith. They forced him to go to a temple of the idol, but along Erasmus's route all the idols fell and were destroyed, and from the temple there came fire which fell upon many of the pagans.

These actions angered the emperor, who had Erasmus enclosed in a barrel full of protruding spikes and rolled down a hill. An angel healed him from these wounds.

When he was recaptured, he was brought before the emperor and beaten and whipped, then coated with pitch and set alight (as Christians had been in Nero's games), and still he survived. Thrown into prison with the intention of letting him die of starvation, Erasmus managed to escape.

He was recaptured and tortured in the Roman province of Illyricum, after boldly preaching and converting numerous pagans to Christianity. Finally, according to this version of his death, his abdomen was slit open and his intestines wound around a windlass. This version may have developed from interpreting an icon that showed him with a windlass, signifying his patronage of sailors.

Veneration and patronage
Erasmus may have become the patron of sailors because he is said to have continued preaching even after a thunderbolt struck the ground beside him. This prompted sailors, who were in danger from sudden storms and lightning, to claim his prayers. The electrical discharges at the mastheads of ships were read as a sign of his protection and came to be called "Saint Elmo's Fire".

Pope Gregory the Great recorded in the 6th century that the relics of Erasmus were preserved in the cathedral of Formia. When the old Formiae was razed by the Saracens in 842, the cult of Erasmus was moved to Gaeta. He is currently the patron of Gaeta, Santeramo in Colle and Formia.

There is an altar to Erasmus in the north transept of St. Peter's Basilica. A copy of Nicolas Poussin's Martyrdom of St Erasmus serves as the altarpiece.

Besides his patronage of mariners, Erasmus is invoked against colic in children, abdominal pain, intestinal ailments and diseases, cramps and the pain of women in labour, as well as cattle pests.

Gallery

See also
 St. Elmo Hall, a name for some chapter houses of Delta Phi fraternity
 St. Elmo's fire, a meteorological phenomenon named after the saint
 List of early Christian saints
 Saint Erasmus of Formia, patron saint archive
 Blessed Peter González, patron of Spanish and Portuguese mariners is also invoked as "San Telmo" or "San Elmo".

References

External links

 The Golden Legend (Saint Erasmus) – e-text adapted from Wynken de Worde's edition of 1527.
 Saint of the Day, June 2: Erasmus of Formia at SaintPatrickDC.org

3rd-century births
303 deaths
Fourteen Holy Helpers
4th-century Christian martyrs
4th-century Romans
Angelic visionaries
Christians martyred during the reign of Diocletian